Cachucha is a Spanish solo dance in  or  time, similar to the bolero. Cachucha is danced to an Andalusian national song with castanet accompaniment.

Etymology 

From Spanish , small boat.

History 

The Cachucha was created in Cuba though it is now considered a Spanish dance. Fanny Elssler (1810-1884, Vienna) popularized this dance when she introduced it to the public in the ballet from Rossini's opera La donna del lago in 1830s London, and cemented its fame in Jean Coralli's ballet Le Diable boiteux (1836, Vienna).

Gilbert and Sullivan sets the dance for the entire company in Act 2 of the Savoy Opera The Gondoliers as the chorus sings Dance a Cachucha.

References 

Free Online Dictionary, Thesaurus and Encyclopedia
Britannica Student Encyclopedia

External links
Video clip of cachucha

Latin dances
Spanish dances
Spanish folk music
Spanish music